Festival of monodrama and mime is a theatre festival dedicated to mimes and monodramas. It is held annually near the end of June or the first week in July in Belgrade, Serbia, and it's traditionally held within the Puppet Theatre "Pinocchio". Festival of Monodrama and Mime participants are awarded in five different categories: best monodrama, best mime, most successful participant, an award for ingenuity, and the Audience's award.

Festival leadership 
Following the decision of the Municipal Assembly of Zemun, in 2015 new members of the Council and Director of the festival were appointed. Predrag Miletić, an actor of the National Theatre, was chosen as Head of the Festival. Radomir Putnik, Rada Đuričin, Igor Bojović, Rastko Janković, Stevan Rodić and Stanivuk Vanja were chosen as members. Borislav Balać was appointed as Festival director, and Milovan Zdravković was selected as Selector of the festival. The editors of the festival are Radomir Putnik and Tadija Miletić.

Festivаl publications 
In addition to the regular annual program booklet, the festival has published six books from several authors:

 Antologijа savremene monodrаme, Rаdomir Putnik	
 Pаnorаmа monodrаmа, Rаdomir Putnik	
 Pozorišne i televizijske monodrаme, Rаdomir Putnik
 Moje monodrаme, Rаdа Đuričin	
 Sаmi sa publikom, Mirjаnа Ojdаnić	
 Zemunskа pozorjа, Alojz Ujes

See also 
 Ognjenka Milićević

References

External links 
 Official presentation

Theatre festivals in Serbia
Monodrama
Pantomime
Mime
Summer events in Serbia
New Belgrade